Priscilla "Cilla" Duncan (born 19 May 1983) is a former association football player who represented New Zealand at international level as a central midfielder. Following her retirement from playing, she has been involved with the media aspect of the game, working for both Oceania Football Confederation and FIFA in a media relations capacity.

Duncan represented New Zealand at age group level, appearing at the OFC U-20 Qualifying Tournament 2002 and was named New Zealand Young Player  of the Year in 2002 and 2003.

She made her full Football Ferns debut against Samoa on 7 April 2003 and scored her first senior international goal in a 5–0 win over Papua New Guinea on 11 April 2003.

Duncan represented New Zealand at the 2007 FIFA Women's World Cup finals in China, where they lost to Brazil 0–5, Denmark (0–2) and China (0–2).

In 2009, she was appointed Head of Media and Communications with the Oceania Football Confederation, a position she held for three years.  She worked at the London 2012 Summer Olympics and in 2013, Duncan joined FIFA as part of their Media Department.

Personal
She is married to fellow New Zealand footballer Katie Duncan (née Hoyle).

References

External links

1983 births
Living people
New Zealand women's international footballers
New Zealand women's association footballers
2007 FIFA Women's World Cup players
LGBT association football players
New Zealand LGBT sportspeople
Lesbian sportswomen
Women's association football midfielders
Association footballers' wives and girlfriends